Allan Cup Hockey (ACH), formerly Major League Hockey until 2011, is the top tier Canadian senior ice hockey league in the province of Ontario.  Founded in 1990, as the Southwestern Senior "A" Hockey League, the ACH is a member of the Ontario Hockey Association and Hockey Canada. The ACH's champion contends for the Allan Cup each year.  The league came to its latest incarnation when it lost several teams leaving it with two and as a result it merged with the Eastern Ontario Senior Hockey League in 2008.

History

Major League Hockey gained its name in 2003. Since 1990, Major League Hockey was known as the Southwestern Senior "A" Hockey League.  This league was created through a merger between the Central Senior "B" Hockey League, the Seaway-Cyclone Senior "B" Hockey League, and the Southern Ontario Senior "A" Hockey League.  The formation of the Major League Hockey marked the first time since 1987 and the folding of the OHA Senior A Hockey League that the Ontario Hockey Association (OHA) has crowned a top level senior league.  In 2005, the OHA also granted the Eastern Ontario Senior Hockey League the same status.  Major League Hockey, despite its formation in 1990, has its roots scattered across a variety of leagues dating back as far as 1959.

The first season of Ontario Hockey Association senior hockey was the 1890-91 season, for the Cosby Cup. Ottawa Hockey Club won the first ever Senior title defeating Toronto St. Georges 5–0. The first "Major" league came in 1929, known as the OHA Senior A Hockey League.  The league lasted for fifty season, its teams winning 16 Allan Cups.  The league was replaced by the Continental Senior A Hockey League in 1979.  The Continental league was renamed the OHA Senior A Hockey League in 1980 and lasted until 1987. Teams of the Continental league won 4 Allan Cups.

In 2008, the Brantford Blast became the first OHA team since the Brantford Motts Clamatos in 1987 to win the Allan Cup.  As hosts of the 2008 Allan Cup, the Blast failed to win their league and were allowed to bypass the OHA Final against the Whitby Dunlops and the Renwick Cup against the Thunder Bay Hawks.  After almost a months rest, the Blast competed at home for the Allan Cup and won the entire thing.  After suffering their only loss of the tournament to the Shawinigan Xtreme in the first game, the Blast defeated the Bentley Generals to clinch second in their division.  They defeated the Robertson Cup and EOSHL champion Whitby Dunlops in the quarter-final.  They then knocked off the Major League Hockey and Renwick Cup champion Dundas Real McCoys in the semi-final.  They met Bentley again in the final, and defeated them 3-1 to win the Canadian National Senior "AAA" crown.

In the 2008 off-season, Major League Hockey ran into some issues.  The Windsor St. Clair Saints, the league's only college team, walked away from the league.  The Tillsonburg Vipers have officially left the league, as they have applied for expansion into the independent Western Ontario Athletic Association Senior Hockey League.  The Petrolia Squires are stranded far away from Brantford and Dundas and have also been accepted into the Western Ontario Athletic Association Senior Hockey League.  In the EOSHL, the Frankford Huskies and Marmora Lakers have walked away as well.

Major League Hockey merged with the Eastern Ontario Senior Hockey League in 2008, when AAA-level senior hockey in the OHA shrunk to only five teams.

In 2011, the league changed its name to "Allan Cup Hockey". In 2015, two new teams were added: the Hamilton Steelhawks and the Thorold Athletics.

Former OHA president Brent Ladds served as the commissioner of Allan Cup Hockey from 2013 to 2016.

In 2017, the league announced that the Thorold Athletics were taking leave for the 2018-19 season. The team has yet to return as of the 2019-20 season.

For the 2019-20 season, the Stoney Creek Generals franchise relocated and merged with the Brantford Blast. The Blast was sold to the owners of the Generals in 2018 and was on leave for the 2018-19 season.

For the 2020-21 season, the Whitby Dunlops announced a leave of absence, and the Caledon Crusaders were added as an expansion team. It was later announced that the season would be cancelled entirely.  The league returned to action in 2022 with an 8-game schedule.

Teams

League champions

Southwestern Senior "A"
1991 Exeter Mohawks
1992 Exeter Mohawks
1993 Dunnville Mudcats
1994 Dorchester Dolphins
1995 Ohsweken Riverhawks
1996 Bothwell Bullets
1997 Bothwell Bullets
1998 Aylmer Blues
1999 London MacMaster Chevys
2000 Cambridge Hornets
2001 Simcoe Gunners
2002 Dundas Real McCoys
2003 Dundas Real McCoys

Major League Hockey
2004 Aylmer Blues
2005 Aylmer Blues
2006 Dundas Real McCoys
2007 Brantford Blast
2008 Dundas Real McCoys
2009 Dundas Real McCoys
2010 Dundas Real McCoys
2011 Dundas Real McCoys

EOSHL
2004 Belleville Macs
2005 Norwood Vipers
2006 Whitby Dunlops
2007 Whitby Dunlops
2008 Whitby Dunlops

Allan Cup Hockey
2012 Dundas Real McCoys
2013 Brantford Blast
2014 Brantford Blast
2015 Dundas Real McCoys
2016 Stoney Creek Generals
2017 Stoney Creek Generals
2018 Stoney Creek Generals
2019 Stoney Creek Generals
2020 playoffs cancelled
2021 season cancelled
2022 Dundas Real McCoys
Bolded teams won the Robertson Cup as Ontario Hockey Association champions.

Allan Cup winners
2008 Brantford Blast
2014 Dundas Real McCoys
2018 Stoney Creek Generals

Former member teams
Please note: All teams in this list are listed ONLY with the last league they were involved with.

ACH/MLH/Southwestern Sr. A
Aylmer Blues
Baltimore Clippers
Bothwell Bullets
Cambridge Hornets
Creemore Valley Hawks
Dorchester Dolphins
Dunnville Mudcats
Exeter Mohawks
Ingersol B's
London Admirals
Norwood Vipers
Ohsweken Riverhawks
Orillia Tundras
Oxford Blues
Petrolia Squires
Point Edward Comets
Simcoe Gunners
Stoney Creek Generals (franchise relocated, merged with Brantford Blast)
Strathroy Jets
Tillsonburg Vipers
Welland Whalers
Windsor St. Clair Saints

Eastern Sr. A
Cobourg Lynx
Deseronto Bulldogs
Kingston Aces
Marmora Lakers
St. Lawrence Falcons
Tamworth Braves

Southern Ontario Sr. A
Smithville Real McCoys
Tillsonburg Maroons
Woodstock Gems

Southern Int. B
Ayr Rockets
Milton Aeros
Norwich Imperials
Paris 29ers
Plattsville Combines
Port Dover Lakers
Rockton Real McCoys
Six Nations Redmen
St. Marys Stone Town Flyers

Southern Counties Int. B
Caledonia Seniors
Cheltenham Harvesters
Delhi Leafs
Elmira Polar Kings
Fergus Flyers
Lucan-Ilderton Jets
New Hamburg Screaming Eagles
Preston Jesters
Simcoe County Kings

Central Int. C
Arthur Tigers
Goderich Sailors
New Hamburg Panthers
Port Elgin Sunocos

Central Sr. A
Durham Huskies
Elora Rocks
Harriston Blues
Hillsburgh Seniors
Palmerston 81's
Tavistock Royals

Northern Sr. A
Creemore Chiefs
Grand Valley Harvesters
Honeywood Cougars
Owen Sound Canadians
Shelburne Muskies

OHA Int. C
Clinton Colts
Kincardine Texacos
Lucknow Lancers
Milverton Four Wheel Drives
Mitchell Red Devils
Seaforth Seniors
Southampton Seniors
Wiarton Redmen

Seaway-Cyclone Sr. B
Alvinston 77's
Dresden Lumber Kings
Lambeth Seniors
Wallaceburg Whalers
Walpole Island Hawks
Watford Generals

Seaway-Cyclone Int. B
Glencoe Centennials

Seaway Int. C
Blenheim Seniors
Leamington Lakers
Tilbury Selects
Wheatley Omsteads

Seaway-Western Int. C
Chatham Royals
Forest Boyds
Sandwich West Seniors

Western/Tri-County Int. C
Belmont Blazers
Point Edward Easy Movers

Cyclone Int. D
West Lorne Blues

References

External links
Official ACH website
OHA website

1
Senior ice hockey